P. S. Supal (born 7 February 1970) is an Indian politician and leader of Communist Party of India. He represented Punalur constituency in the Kerala Legislative Assembly from 1996 to 2006. He is the son of former MLA P.K. Sreenivasan. He was elected from Punalur (State Assembly constituency) in the Kerala Legislative Assembly election 2021.

Positions Held
 Secretary, CPI Kollam district 
 Assistant Secretary, CPI Kollam District Council
 Secretary, AIKS Kollam District Committee
 Member of CPI Kerala State Council, 
Member of Kerala University Senate; 
President, AIYF Kerala State Committee; 
Secretary, AIYF Kerala State Committee; 
Vice President, AIYF National Council; 
President Rehabilitation Plantation Workers Union

References

Communist Party of India politicians from Kerala
1970 births
Living people